Alec Daniel Bohm (born August 3, 1996) is an American professional baseball third baseman for the Philadelphia Phillies of Major League Baseball (MLB).

Born and raised in Omaha, Nebraska, Bohm was a standout hitter for Roncalli Catholic High School, but was not selected in the 2015 MLB Draft. Instead, out of high school, he chose to play college baseball for the Wichita State Shockers. Bohm was offensively productive in his three years with the Shockers, maintaining a batting average of over .300 in his tenure. Outside of Wichita State, Bohm also played collegiate summer baseball in both the Coastal Plain League and the Cape Cod Baseball League.

The Phillies selected Bohm third overall in the 2018 MLB draft, and he signed with the team that June. The Phillies planned to have him reach Class A in their farm system by the end of 2018, but a knee injury delayed that process. Bohm appeared in the All-Star Futures Game in 2019, and began the 2020 season at an alternate training site after the COVID-19 pandemic forced the cancellation of the Minor League Baseball season. The Phillies recalled Bohm from that training site in August, and he finished out the season as the team's everyday third baseman. Following a strong rookie season, Bohm started the 2021 MLB season at third base with the Phillies, but a number of defensive errors and offensive struggles sent him back down to the minors that August.

Early life
Bohm was born on August 3, 1996, in Omaha, Nebraska, the son of Dan and Lisa Bohm. In high school, Bohm was a power hitter for the Roncalli Catholic baseball team in Omaha; in his final two seasons, he boasted a batting average of .533 and .526, respectively, and he was named an All-Nebraska player by the Omaha World-Herald for both seasons. In 2015, the summer after his senior year of high school, Bohm both won the Connie Mack World Series Home Run Derby and tied for fourth place at the Triple-A Home Run Derby in Werner Park.

Despite being rated by the Perfect Game baseball scouting service as the number one baseball player from the state of Nebraska, no Major League Baseball (MLB) team selected Bohm in the 2015 MLB Draft. Part of the problem was a growth spurt during Bohm's senior year of high school, which left him "in that awkward stage", as high school coach Jake Hoover referred to it, when baseball scouts came to visit. Bohm wished to remain in Nebraska for college, but was not recruited by the Nebraska Cornhuskers. Instead, he accepted a scholarship offer to play college baseball for the Wichita State Shockers.

College career
Bohm's college baseball career at Wichita State began when he hit a home run in his first at bat. Over the course of their college careers, Bohm and outfielder Greyson Jenista received the nickname "The Bash Brothers" from their teammates, a reference to their respective offensive capabilities. Bohm often batted third in the lineup, after leadoff hitter Luke Ritter and Jenista. As a freshman during the 2016 season, Bohm batted .303, with six home runs and 30 runs batted in (RBIs), enough to receive first-team Freshman All-American honors from Collegiate Baseball Newspaper. That summer, he played for the Wilmington Sharks of the Coastal Plain League (CPL), where he both appeared in the CPL All-Star Game and defeated Dillon Stewart in the home run derby. In 54 games with Wilmington, Bohm batted .330, with 11 home runs and 51 RBIs, and Baseball America named him the number one prospect in the CPL.

Following his freshman performance, Bohm entered the 2017 season with high expectations for his sophomore year. A sophomore slump which saw his batting average fall to .240 by April 2 was followed by a 12-game hitting streak that included four home runs, 16 RBIs, three doubles, and nine runs scored. By the end of the year, his batting average had climbed to .305, with 11 home runs. After the season, Bohm played collegiate summer baseball for the Falmouth Commodores of the Cape Cod Baseball League (CCBL), where he was named a league all-star, was ranked second in the league with a .351 batting average and 28 RBIs, and was tied for fifth in the league with five home runs. Commodores coach Jeff Trundy praised Bohm's performance in the summer league, saying that he "showed [...] that he can hit the best college pitching in the country".

As a junior during the 2018 season, Bohm continued to produce at the plate, batting .339 and leading Wichita State with 55 RBIs and 14 doubles. His 57 runs scored and 16 home runs, meanwhile, led not just Wichita State but the entire American Athletic Conference. His plate discipline received particular attention, as Bohm drew 39 walks that season, and struck out only 28 times in 224 at bats. In addition to being named a Second-Team All-American by Baseball America, Bohm was a semifinalist for both the Golden Spikes Award and the Dick Howser Trophy, given to exemplar college baseball players. Despite his offensive production, there were concerns about Bohm's defensive ability at third base: in addition to committing 14 errors, his fielding percentage was only .899 for the year.

In three years with Wichita State, Bohm had a lifetime .317 batting average, as well as 40 doubles, 33 home runs, and 126 RBIs.

Professional career

Minor league career

The Philadelphia Phillies, who had lacked a strong third baseman since Scott Rolen was traded in 2002, selected Bohm in the first round, third overall, of the 2018 Major League Baseball draft, and he signed with the team on June 12, 2018, for a reported signing bonus of $5.85 million. Phillies director of scouting Johnny Almaraz intended for Bohm to follow a farm system approach that they had employed with outfield prospect Adam Haseley, which would enable him to finish the 2018 Minor League Baseball season with the Class A Lakewood BlueClaws.

Bohm began the 2018 minor league season with the Rookie League GCL Phillies of the Gulf Coast League, with whom he recorded six hits and two RBIs in 12 at bats. On June 25, after playing only three GCL games, he was promoted to the Class A Short Season Williamsport Crosscutters. His rise through the Phillies' farm system was interrupted when Bohm was hit by a pitch on July 12, catching a nerve in his knee. He was placed on the disabled list with a shin contusion and was seen in a walking boot. After missing over a month of the season due to injury, Williamsport reactivated Bohm on August 20. In 29 games and 107 at bats for the Crosscutters, Bohm batted .224, with 12 RBIs and five doubles.

Heading into the 2019 season, MLB.com ranked Bohm the number 50 prospect in baseball, while Baseball America placed him at number 65. He opened the season with Lakewood, where he batted .367 with nine doubles, three home runs, and 11 RBIs before receiving a promotion to the Class A-Advanced Clearwater Threshers on April 30. He stayed there until June 21, batting .329 with four home runs and 27 RBIs in 40 games before receiving another promotion, this time to the Double-A Reading Phillies. While playing with Reading, Bohm was selected for the MLB All-Star Futures Game; he was the only Phillies prospect selected for the exhibition game. Across Lakewood, Clearwater, and Reading, Bohm batted .305 for the season, with 21 home runs and 80 RBIs in 475 at bats. Defensively, he played 83 games at third base and 23 at first.

At the conclusion of the 2019 minor league season, Bohm and pitcher Ethan Lindow received the Paul Owens Award, given annually to the top position player prospect and the top pitching prospect in the Phillies organization. He was also assigned to the Scottsdale Scorpions of the Arizona Fall League (AFL) alongside a number of other Phillies prospects to further develop his skills. In 19 AFL games, Bohm batted .361 with two home runs, nine RBIs, and six runs scored.

Philadelphia Phillies

2020

Because the COVID-19 pandemic led to the cancellation of the 2020 Minor League Baseball season, the Phillies were allowed to maintain a "pool" of up to 60 players, including prospects like Bohm and Spencer Howard. While the 30 players on the opening day roster would begin the season in Philadelphia, the rest would practice at an alternate training site in Allentown, Pennsylvania. Manager Joe Girardi told reporters early in the season that Bohm would remain at the training site until he was in a position to play "almost every day". 

Bohm received that opportunity on August 13, when he was called up to fill an injured Adam Haseley's spot in the lineup: Jean Segura was moved from third to second base to make room for Bohm at his preferred position, while second baseman Scott Kingery became a utility player. He made his major league debut that day, scoring a double against the Baltimore Orioles in his first at bat. His first major league home run followed shortly after, with an August 23 solo shot against the Atlanta Braves as the Phillies won 5–4. 

Bohm had 180 plate appearances in the pandemic-shortened season, in which he batted .338 with four home runs, 23 RBIs, and 24 runs scored. He was particularly adept with runners on base, boasting an MLB-leading .452 batting average with runners in scoring position. At the end of the season, Bohm tied with San Diego Padres infielder Jake Cronenworth for runner-up in NL Rookie of the Year voting, a title that ultimately went to Devin Williams of the Milwaukee Brewers.

2021
Bohm received his first opening day start in 2021, where he impressed both offensively and defensively against the Atlanta Braves, first with an inning-ending throw to first baseman Rhys Hoskins, followed by a sixth-inning go-ahead RBI. Bohm was the focal point of a controversial call on April 11, 2021, scoring the eventual game-winning run in a victory over the Atlanta Braves.  As the season developed, Bohm's missteps at third base attracted attention, particularly after he made two errors in one 11–3 loss to the Boston Red Sox on May 21. By the end of the game, Bohm had committed seven errors that season and had missed several other defensive plays. He struggled at the plate as well, with only a .225 batting average. On July 10, 2021, Bohm was unexpectedly removed in the eighth inning of an 11–2 victory over the Red Sox, with Ronald Torreyes filling in at third base. Girardi later revealed that Bohm, who had hit a home run earlier in the game, had been removed due to COVID-19 protocols. The following day, it was announced that Bohm had tested positive but was asymptomatic for the virus, and that pitchers Aaron Nola, Connor Brogdon, and Bailey Falter had also been placed on the COVID-19 restricted list due to contact tracing protocols. Even after his return, Bohm continued to struggle with fielding, particularly with ground balls, and by August, utility player Ronald Torreyes had become the everyday third baseman for the Phillies. On August 22, he was sent back down to Triple-A Lehigh Valley. He spent a month in Triple-A learning how to "slow the game down a little bit and relax" before being called back up on September 28 for the final six games of the season, serving as a bench batter while Freddy Galvis and Ronald Torreyes split time at third base. 

Bohm batted .247 in 115 games for the Phillies that season, with seven home runs and 47 RBIs in 380 at bats. He also committed 15 errors at third base (tops in the NL), for a .936 fielding percentage.

2022
Both Bohm and Bryson Stott, the Phillies' top-rated prospect, made the Opening Day roster for the 2022 season, with Girardi telling reporters that he would give both infielders regular playing time. After making three throwing errors in as many innings for the Phillies' April 11 game against the New York Mets, Bohm was caught on camera telling shortstop Didi Gregorius, "I fucking hate this place". He apologized for the incident after the game, saying that the comment was made out of frustration.

On June 8, 2022, Bohm hit a game-tying home run against Milwaukee Brewers closer Josh Hader. It was the first run given up by Hader since July 28, 2021, and the first home run he had given up in the same time span. Hader was one scoreless inning away from setting an MLB record for consecutive scoreless innings at 41. The Phillies would go on to win the game 3-2 after Matt Vierling hit a go-ahead home run later in the inning, leading to Hader’s first blown save since July 7, 2021.

In 2022, Bohm batted .280/.315/.398, and tied with Alex Bregman and Marcus Semien for the major league lead in sacrifice flies, with 10. He reached on an error 10 times, tops in the NL. He was fourth in the NL in singles (124), and led the Phillies in hits (164; 9th in the NL) and double plays grounded into (18; 5th in the NL).

During game three of the 2022 World Series Bohm hit a solo home run against Houston Astros pitcher Lance McCullers Jr. which marked the 1000th home run in World Series history.

International career; Team USA 
On October 10, 2019, USA Baseball named Bohm to the 28-man roster for the 2019 WBSC Premier12 championship, one of several qualifying tournaments for the 2020 Summer Olympics. As Team USA's starting third baseman, Bohm batted .233 in nine games, with one home run and four RBIs. The team took fourth place in the tournament, falling to Mexico in extra innings of the bronze medal match.

References

External links

Wichita State Shockers bio
MiLB.com page

1996 births
Living people
Baseball players from Nebraska
Clearwater Threshers players
Falmouth Commodores players
Florida Complex League Phillies players
Lakewood BlueClaws players
Major League Baseball third basemen
Philadelphia Phillies players
Reading Fightin Phils players
Scottsdale Scorpions players
Sportspeople from Omaha, Nebraska
United States national baseball team players
Wichita State Shockers baseball players
Williamsport Crosscutters players
2019 WBSC Premier12 players